Andover is an unincorporated community in northeast Harrison County, in the U.S. state of Missouri. The community is Missouri Route T six miles north of Blythedale and three quarter mile south of the Missouri-Iowa border. Interstate 35 passes three miles to the west.

History
Andover had its start in 1873 when the railroad was extended to that point.  A post office called Andover was established in 1872, and remained in operation until 1943.

In 1925, Andover had 54 inhabitants.

References

Unincorporated communities in Harrison County, Missouri
Unincorporated communities in Missouri